Feeding Sea Lions is short silent film featuring Paul Boyton feeding sea lions at his Sea Lion Park at Coney Island. Boyton is shown feeding the trained sea lions, twelve in number. The sea lions follow Boyton up the steps of the pool and then follow him back into the water. One of them steals food out of the basket. The film was made by Lubin Studios on March 10, 1900.

Cast
Paul Boyton
Sea lions

External links
Lubin Studios
Silent film
Sea lion

History of Coney Island Sea Lion Park

Black-and-white documentary films
1900 films
American silent short films
American black-and-white films
Films about pinnipeds
Films set in Coney Island
Lubin Manufacturing Company films
1900s short documentary films
1900s American films